James Evan Johnson (born April 7, 1954) is an American wrestler. He competed in the men's Greco-Roman 90 kg at the 1976 Summer Olympics.

References

1954 births
Living people
American male sport wrestlers
Olympic wrestlers of the United States
Wrestlers at the 1976 Summer Olympics
People from Cokato, Minnesota
Pan American Games medalists in wrestling
Pan American Games silver medalists for the United States
Wrestlers at the 1991 Pan American Games
Medalists at the 1991 Pan American Games
20th-century American people
21st-century American people